Tallowbox Mountain is a summit in the U.S. state of Oregon.

Tallowbox Mountain was named in the 1880s for the pioneers' custom of preserving venison tallow in a tallowbox.

References

Mountains of Jackson County, Oregon
Mountains of Oregon